Black Girl Lost is an urban fiction novel by Donald Goines that was published in 1974.

Plot
The novel and details the life of a girl named Sandra.  She grows up in a home with an absent father and an alcoholic mother, but finds a father figure in a local Jewish shop owner. After detailing some troubling scenes from her childhood, the novel moves to the present where Sandra picks up a package discarded by a passing car that is pursued by police.

Eventually bringing this package to a classmate who deals drugs, Sandra falls in love with the pusher (neither uses drugs  themselves) and things start to pick up for both of them.  Neither has to steal any longer to provide themselves with clothes or food, and the two find solace in each other and move in together.  The boyfriend is arrested for possession and sent to a correctional institution from which he is to be released when he turns 18.

While he is incarcerated, Sandra finds herself held hostage in the shared apartment by some characters who not only rob her, but gang rape her as well as beating her.  When she visits her boyfriend in prison and tells him what happens, he decides to escape from the correctional facility. A bloody climax is the result and Sandra's boy friend, who refuses to go back to jail, insists on holding court in the street, once he has taken out the thugs who violated Sandra.

Reception and legacy 
In a review from 2013, Pablo Tanguay writes that the novel starts nuanced, but "becomes relentless, a series of horrors, each horror (possibly) worse than the horror preceding." Though Tanguay describes the novel as not "artistic", he does describe the novel: "relentless, and his vision almost unbearably true: Black Girl Lost insists, as does, so far as we know, the universe, that no one gets out alive. Goines’s universe just happens to be the American ghetto of the Seventies."

Nas has a song called "Black Girl Lost", which has content and title inspired by the book.

References 

Novels by Donald Goines
African-American novels
1974 American novels